Boehm's bush squirrel (Paraxerus boehmi) is a species of rodent in the family Sciuridae found in Burundi, the Democratic Republic of the Congo, Kenya, Rwanda, South Sudan, Tanzania, Uganda, and Zambia. Its natural habitats are subtropical or tropical moist lowland forest, subtropical or tropical moist montane forest, and moist savanna.

References

External links
 Photographs of Boehm's bush squirrel in Uganda.

Paraxerus
Mammals described in 1886
Taxonomy articles created by Polbot